Dr. APJ Abdul Kalam UIT Jhabua, popularly known as UIT Jhabua, is a public (government)  college in Jhabua. Madhya Pradesh, India. The institution was established by the government of Madhya Pradesh with the name UIT Jhabua. It is a constituent institution of Rajiv Gandhi Prodoyogiki Vishwavidyalaya (RGPV), Bhopal, established in 2015.

History
To address the growing need for engineering expertise, the government of Madhya Pradesh created UIT Jhabua in 2015. The institute initially offered only Bachelor of Engineering (B.E.) and Bachelor of Technology (B.Tech.) in Computer Science, Engineering and  Mechanical Engineering. The institute has been renamed after former president Dr. APJ Abdul Kalam  by the government.

Courses offered

Undergraduate courses
The B.E. and B.Tech degree is four years (eight semesters) long and is offered in the following fields

References 

Universities and colleges in Madhya Pradesh
Jhabua district
Memorials to A. P. J. Abdul Kalam